Shannon Martin is a Canadian politician, who was elected to the Manitoba Legislative Assembly in a by-election on January 28, 2014. He represents the electoral district of McPhillips as a member of the Progressive Conservative Party of Manitoba.

Martin first ran as a Progressive Conservative candidate in the 1999 Manitoba provincial election, in the Winnipeg division of Kildonan. He was defeated by Dave Chomiak of the New Democratic Party.

Prior to his election to the legislature, Martin was executive director of Reaching E-Quality Employment Services, a Winnipeg-based not-for-profit that assists persons with disabilities find employment. He was also provincial director of the Canadian Federation of Independent Business.

He was re-elected in the 2016 and 2019 provincial elections.

Electoral record

|Progressive Conservative
| Shannon Martin
|align="right"| 2,642
|align="right"| 69.99
|align="right"| -4.01
|align="right"|

| Independent
| Ray Shaw
|align="right"| 138
|align="right"| 3.66
|align="right"| -
|align="right"|

|- bgcolor="white"
!align="right" colspan=3|Total valid votes
!align="right"|3775
!align="right"|
!align="right"|
|align="right"|
|- bgcolor="white"
!align="right" colspan=3|Rejected and declined votes
!align="right"|17
!align="right"|
!align="right"|
|align="right"|
|- bgcolor="white"
!align="right" colspan=3|Turnout
!align="right"|3792
!align="right"|27.51
!align="right"|
|align="right"|
|- bgcolor="white"
!align="right" colspan=3|Electors on the lists
!align="right"|13782
!align="right"|
!align="right"|
|align="right"|

|}

References

Living people
Progressive Conservative Party of Manitoba MLAs
21st-century Canadian politicians
Year of birth missing (living people)